Momentum is an album by Steve Lacy which was released on the RCA Novus label in 1987 and features six of Lacy's compositions (although tracks 2 and 3 only appeared on the CD edition) with texts by Giulia Niccolai, Herman Melville, and Brion Gysin performed by Lacy, Bobby Few, Steve Potts, Jean-Jacques Avenel, Oliver Johnson, and Irene Aebi.

Reception 
The Allmusic review by Scott Yanow awarded the album 4½ stars stating, "On Steve Lacy's first album for an American label in over a decade, his sextet is heard on four extensive originals by the great soprano saxophonist. The music is complex yet often melodic, and, although Irene Aebi takes typically eccentric vocals on two of the songs, the main reasons to acquire this album are for the thoughtful yet unpredictable solos of Lacy and altoist Steve Potts. ".

Track listing
All compositions by Steve Lacy except where noted.
 "The Bath" – 13:03
 "The Gaze" – 11:10
 "Utah" (text by Giulia Niccolai) – 6:58
 "Art" (text by Herman Melville) – 8:56
 "Momentum" – 7:58
 "The Song" (text by Brion Gysin) – 15:02

Personnel
Steve Lacy – soprano saxophone, tambourine
Bobby Few – piano
Steve Potts – alto and soprano saxophones, tambourine
Jean-Jacques Avenel – bass
Oliver Johnson – drums
Irene Aebi – vocals, violin, cello

References 

1987 albums
Steve Lacy (saxophonist) albums
Novus Records albums